Gastrotheca microdiscus is a frog species in the frog family Hemiphractidae. It is endemic to southeastern Brazil between southern São Paulo and Santa Catarina states. Its natural habitats are undisturbed primary forests. It is a canopy species hiding in bromeliads. It is not considered threatened by the IUCN.

References

microdiscus
Endemic fauna of Brazil
Amphibians of Brazil
Taxonomy articles created by Polbot
Amphibians described in 1910